Moshe Brener (משה ברנר; born March 4, 1971) is an Israeli former professional basketball player. He played the forward position. He was the 2005 Israeli Basketball Premier League Sixth Man of the Year.

Biography

Brener is 6' 7" (201 cm) tall. He played for Maccabi Hadera from 1991-93, for Rishon Lezion from 1993-97, for Givat Shmuel from 1998-99 and from 2000-09, and for Maccabi Haifa from 1999-2000, and for Hapoel Jat in 2016-17. In 390 career games in the Israeli Premier League, ninth-most in league history, Brener  scored 3,067 points. He was the 2005 Israeli Basketball Premier League Sixth Man of the Year.

References

External links
חוזרים לליגה: מכבי גבעת שמואל, Walla, October 24, 2003.

Living people

1971 births
Israeli men's basketball players
Maccabi Haifa B.C. players
Maccabi Rishon LeZion basketball players